Alexander Steinweiss (March 24, 1917 – July 17, 2011) was an American graphic design artist known for inventing album cover art.

Early life
Alex Steinweiss was born on March 24, 1917, in Brooklyn. His father was a women's shoe designer from Warsaw and his mother was a seamstress from Riga, Latvia. They moved to the Lower East Side of Manhattan and eventually settled in the Brighton Beach section of Brooklyn.

Steinweiss said he was destined to be a commercial artist. He studied under Leon Friend at Abraham Lincoln High School, and his classmates marveled that he "could take a brush, dip it in some paint and make letters," he recalled. "So I said to myself, 'If some day I could become a good sign painter, that would be terrific!"'

Steinweiss earned a scholarship to the Parsons School of Design.

Career
After graduation Steinweiss worked for three years for the Austrian poster designer Joseph Binder, whose flat color and simplified human figures were popular at the time and influenced his own work.

In the 1930s recorded music was sold in plain packaging, or record shop advertising 'bags'; sets of discs were also usually issued in plain albums. However, colored artwork had been used on special albums, from World War I. This was separately printed and pasted onto album covers and occasionally inside the albums: for example, HMV's issue of Liza Lehmann's "In a Persian Garden" and operettas by Edward German and Gilbert & Sullivan were all available by 1918 in such decorated albums.  In 1938, Alex Steinweiss was the first art director for Columbia Records, where he introduced a wider application of album covers and cover art. "They were so drab, so unattractive," said Steinweiss, "I convinced the executives to let me design a few."

During World War II, Steinweiss became Columbia Records' advertising manager. He left for a job at the Navy's Training and Development Center in New York City, where he produced teaching materials and cautionary posters.  After the war, Steinweiss freelanced for Columbia. During one lunch meeting there, the company's president, Ted Wallerstein, introduced him to an innovation that the company was about to unveil: the long-playing record. But there was a problem. The heavy, folded kraft paper used to protect 78 rpm records left marks on the vinyl microgroove when 33 1/3 rpm LPs were stacked.  Steinweiss was asked to develop a jacket for the new format and, with help from his brother-in-law, found a manufacturer, Imperial Paper Box, that was willing to invest about $250,000 in equipment. Louis Sukoff from Imperial Paper Box held the patent for the phonograph record housing also known as the record jacket.

Steinweiss was active in record cover design from 1938 until 1973, when he semi-retired to devote himself to painting. By his own admission, he designed roughly 2500 covers.  His career can be divided into roughly five periods:

From 1938 to perhaps 1945, he designed all the covers for Columbia. During this period, he developed the entire graphic "language" of album design.

The second period is from 1945 to roughly 1950, during which he was no longer the sole designer for Columbia. He also began designing for other companies. This period is sometimes described as the "First Golden Age" of the album cover.  Steinweiss' signature font, the "Steinweiss scrawl," first appeared in roughly 1947. Steinweiss claims to have invented the LP cover, which first appeared in 1948. Steinweiss can also take credit for the Grecian column design Columbia used in 1948 on the first LP envelopes. The design was borrowed from the earlier 78 rpm album cover, MM577, the Mendelssohn violin concerto played by Nathan Milstein. This performance was chosen by Columbia to be the first 12-inch LP, ML4001.

Starting in around 1950, Steinweiss did the covers and record label for Remington, and began a more than 20-year association with both Decca and London Records. Like his earlier periods, most of his early 1950s designs are drawn, for Columbia, RCA, Remington, Decca and London. This was his third period, when he did drawing, lettering, and layout that was often brilliant but perhaps not as memorable as his late 1940s period.  It was during this period that he collaborated with Margaret Bourke-White on a memorable series of covers for Columbia.

Starting in the mid-1950s, Steinweiss added photography to his palette. Steinweiss's photographic covers are remarkably distinctive. He utilized strange garish colors, odd lighting, and numerous visual puns and reference points.  He continued to work for Decca and London, and did the entire series of covers (and the logo and label) for the startup Everest label from 1958 until about 1960. This was his fourth period, characterized by photography but continuing to use the entire range of tools he had developed.

Steinweiss' final period of record cover design was from 1960 to roughly 1973, again working for Decca and London. His new developments of the period were in die-cut designs and collage.

Steinweiss's cover for the original Broadway cast recording of South Pacific (1949) has been in almost continuous use ever since for the 78rpm set, the LP, the 45rpm set, various tape formats and the CD. The only other graphic design in America to be used for so many years is the Coca-Cola bottle.

In 1942, Steinweiss hired Jim Flora, which launched Flora's 40+ year career as a commercial artist.

In 2001, Steinweiss was featured in Carlo McCormick's gallery show "The LP Show," originating in New York's Exit Art and then in 2002 traveling to the Experience Music Project in Seattle and The Andy Warhol Museum in Pittsburgh.

He was interviewed for a chapter in Sound Unbound: Sampling Digital Music and Culture (The MIT Press, 2008) edited by Paul D. Miller a.k.a. DJ Spooky.

Death
Alex Steinweiss died on July 18, 2011, in Sarasota, Florida. His death was confirmed by his son. In addition to his son, he is survived by a daughter, Hazel Steinweiss, six grandchildren, and three great-grandchildren.

Awards
In 1998, Steinweiss was inducted into the Art Directors Club Hall of Fame.

In 2003, CMP Information and the International Recording Media Association created the Alex Awards for Excellence in album cover art, which were named in honor of Alex Steinweiss.

Sources and further reading

 Alex Steinweiss, Jennifer McKnight-Trontz. For the Record: The Life and Work of Alex Steinweiss , Princeton Architectural Press; 2000.
 Eric Kohler,  In the Groove: Vintage Record Graphics, 1940-1960 Chronicle Books, San Francisco, 1999.
 Heller, Steven; Pomeroy, Karen,  Design Literacy: Understanding Graphic Design Watson-Guptill Pubns, NY, 1997. One chapter on Steinweiss.
 Chusid, Irwin. The Mischievous Art of Jim Flora (Fantagraphics Books, 2004); features an interview with Steinweiss
Heller, Steven, and Reagan, Kevin: Alex Steinweiss, The Inventor of the Modern Album Cover, Taschen, 2009.

See also
 List of AIGA medalists

External links
One cover collector's blog on cover design, currently shows over 100 Steinweiss covers
Alex Steinweiss - Profile at The Remington Site
Art Directors Club biography, portrait and images of work
California Art Gallery Website with  biography and images of work
A tribute to Columbia Records C-11 (1938), Steinweiss' first record cover
PM Magazine (June-July 1941) lengthy profile of Steinweiss, with numerous reproductions of his commercial work, focusing on musical items

AIGA medalists
American graphic designers
American illustrators
People from Brooklyn
Jewish American artists
1917 births
2011 deaths
People from Brighton Beach